Ethelyn Dahleatte Maria Tucker (December 3, 1871, in Hardwick, Massachusetts – August 23, 1959) was an American botanist, author, and librarian at Harvard University's Arnold Arboretum in Boston, Massachusetts.

Written works

References

1871 births
1959 deaths
American women botanists
American women writers
People from Hardwick, Massachusetts
American women librarians
American librarians
19th-century American women scientists
20th-century American women scientists
20th-century American women writers
20th-century American botanists